The University of Southern Maine (USM) is a public university with campuses in Portland, Gorham and Lewiston in the U.S. state of Maine. It is the southernmost of the University of Maine System. It was founded as two separate state universities, Gorham Normal School and Portland University. The two universities, later known as Gorham State College and the University of Maine at Portland, were combined in 1970 to help streamline the public university system in Maine and eventually expanded by adding the Lewiston campus in 1988.

The Portland Campus is home to the Edmund Muskie School of Public Service, the Bio Sciences Research Institute, the Osher Lifelong Learning Institute and the Osher Map Library, and the USM School of Business. The Gorham campus, much more residential, is home to the School of Education and Human Development and the School of Music. As of 2021, USM had 5,950 undergraduate students and 1,750 graduate students, with a student-faculty ratio of 13:3.

History
Evolving from Gorham Academy into an institution of higher education, USM originated in 1878 as Gorham Normal School, later called Gorham State Teachers College and then Gorham State College. In 1970 that institution merged with the University of Maine at Portland (previously Portland Junior College) and became the University of Maine at Portland-Gorham (UMPG). The name was changed to University of Southern Maine in 1978. The Lewiston-Auburn campus was founded in 1988.

2014 financial problems 
At the beginning of 2014, administrators at USM announced that the university had found itself in dire financial straits, and would be announcing program closures and faculty layoffs, including long-term just cause faculty and tenured faculty. President Theodora Kalikow and Provost Michael Stevenson announced that four departments would be closed: the Recreation and Leisure Studies Department, the GeoSciences Department, the Arts and Humanities program at Lewiston-Auburn College, and the graduate program American and New England Studies (the Recreation and Leisure Studies closure was later rescinded). A week later, twelve individual faculty members in various departments were informed that they would be laid off effective May 31. As a result of protests led by USM students, the layoffs were rescinded by Kalikow. Later that year, Chancellor Page asked Kalikow for her resignation as USM president.

This process was restarted in October 2014, when Interim President David T. Flanagan (former CEO of a power company) and Provost Joseph McDonnell announced that the three programs targeted for elimination in March would indeed be eliminated, and two more: French and Applied Medical Sciences. In addition, USM faculty were notified that twenty-five departments would have to shed fifty full-time faculty members, whether through retirement or layoffs. In the end, 36 faculty members retired, but since some of them were not in targeted departments, 25 faculty members were fired.

Local business leaders claimed the cuts would impair Maine's economy and many faculty, students, staff, and community members disputed administration claims about financial insolvency. Critics claimed that the layoffs were arbitrary and capricious, an attempt to eliminate outspoken faculty critical of administration policies and actions, and in violation of the Faculty Senate governance document and the faculty union's Collective Bargaining Agreement. All of the faculty layoffs were immediately challenged through grievances filed by the union against the University of Maine System. Following an investigation, the American Association of University Professors (AAUP) voted in 2015 to censure the university.

Leadership 

William J. MacLeod served as president from 1970 until 1971. Louis J.P. Calisti served as president from 1971 until 1973. Walter P. Fridinger served as president in 1973. N. Edd Miller served as president from 1973 until 1978. Kenneth W. Allen served as president from 1978 until 1979. Robert L. Woodbury served as president from 1979 until 1986. Patricia R. Plante served as president from 1987 to 1991. Richard Pattenaude served as president from 1991 until 2007. Joe Wood served as interim president from 2007 to 2008. Selma Botman served as president from 2008 until 2012. Theodora J. Kalikow served as interim president from 2012 until 2014. Former power company CEO David Flanaganserved as interim president from 2014 until 2015. Glenn Cummings, former speaker of the Maine House, served as president from 2015 until 2022. Jacqueline Edmondson became the 14th president of the University of Southern Maine in July 2022.

Academics
USM offers baccalaureate and master's degree programs as well as doctoral programs in Public Policy and School Psychology.
Undergraduate study is available in roughly 115 areas, and degrees conferred include the B.S, B.A, B.M., and B.F.A. Graduate study is available at the Masters and Doctoral level through the School of Business, School of Education and Human Development, Muskie School of Public Service, School of Social Work, School of Music, School of Engineering and Physical Sciences, School of Nursing, and the School of Environmental, Health, and Life Sciences.

The Department of Educational and School Psychology offers a master's degree and a doctoral degree in School Psychology. The degrees are accredited by the Maine Department of Education. Graduates of the master's program are eligible for certification as school psychologists. Graduates of the doctoral program are eligible for state licensure as psychologists and certification as school psychologists. The department also offers a master's degree with an emphasis in applied behavior analysis that meets the educational requirements to be eligible for board certification as a behavior analyst (BCBA).

The Stonecoast MFA Program in Creative Writing is a graduate program in creative writing which enrolls approximately 100 students in four major genres: creative nonfiction, fiction, poetry, and popular fiction.

The USM School of Business is accredited by the Association to Advance Collegiate Schools of Business (AACSB) an unrecognized accreditor.

Continuing education is available through the Osher Lifelong Learning Institutes.

The University of Southern Maine is one of two schools in the state of Maine that offers an ABET accredited Computer Science degree program.

Maine-Greenland Collaboration 
The Maine-Greenland Collaboration is an interdisciplinary research project to investigate the environmental, socioeconomic and cultural challenges facing coastal communities in Maine and Greenland. The collaboration involves researchers and students from the Muskie School of Public Service, the School of Social Work and many other programs.

Reykjavik University Partnership 
USM has a partnership with Reykjavik University allowing for more students and faculty exchanges between USM and Reykjavik University. The partnership was signed in 2017.

Maine Teacher Residency Program 
The University of Southern Maine administers the Maine Teacher Residency Program for the University of Maine System. The program allows teaching students to work in Maine classrooms while completing their degrees and aims to ease the shortage of teachers. In the 2022–2023 school year, 40 teaching students were enrolled in the program. The program will grow to include 70 more student teachers in the 2023–2024 school year.

Campuses

Portland
The Portland campus is located in the Oakdale neighborhood.  The campus also houses the Wishcamper Center, the Osher Map Library and Smith Center for Cartographic Education, Hannaford Hall, Luther Bonney Hall, Masterton Hall, the Science Building, the Southworth Planetarium, Payson Smith Hall, Abromson Community Education Center, the Alumni House, and the Sullivan Gymnasium complex. Many department offices are located around the perimeter of the campus center in converted multi-story homes as well as in the major buildings. 

The student-run community radio station WMPG and the student-run newspaper The Free Press are located on the Portland campus. 

The primary academic areas at the Portland campus are business, nursing, history, political science, economics, sociology, biology, physics, chemistry, math, English, psychology, media studies, modern and classical languages and literatures, American and New England studies. 

In 2021, the university removed the Woodbury Campus Center and broke ground on the 580-bed Portland Commons dorm that is expected to open June 2023. In 2022, the university announced a fundraising campaign to build an almost $60 million arts center on the Portland campus with an art gallery, a visual arts teaching space, and a performing arts center able to seat 210 people.

The campus is adjacent to Noyes Park, a three-quarter acre landscaped park with large shade trees, and near Fesenden Park, Baxter Boulevard park, and Deering Oaks. The USM Portland campus is bordered by I-295, with on and off ramps accessing the campus on Forest Avenue, and is across the street from a Hannaford grocery store and near restaurants and bars.

Glickman Library 
The Albert Brenner Glickman Family Library is the main library, located on the Portland campus. It includes the Osher Map Library. It houses the Jean Byers Sampson Center for Diversity in Maine, where the current collections represent the African American, Jewish, and Lesbian, Gay, Bisexual and Transgender communities. The library also has a rare books collections, with strong holdings in pre-20th century New England textbooks.

Gorham

Gorham is home to most of the university's dormitories and competitive athletic facilities. The primary academic areas residing in Gorham are industrial technologies, engineering, art, music, theater, counseling and education, anthropology, geography, environmental sciences, and geosciences. McLellan House, built in 1773, was acquired by Gorham State College in 1966. It was converted into dormitories and later into office space. The Academy Building was built in 1803 and purchased by the university in 1878.

Residence Halls located on the Gorham campus include:
Woodward Hall
Dickey and Wood Towers: Dickey and Wood Towers were opened in 1970 and formerly inaugurated in 1973. They are named after Edna Dickey, who taught history at the university from 1945–1972 as well as serving as Dean of Women from 1945–69 and Esther Wood, who taught social sciences from 1930–1973. USM has proposed mothballing the two towers, which currently have several vacant floors, to save $400,000 in 2014.
Upton Hall and Hastings Hall: Upton Hall and the adjacent Hastings Hall are named after Ethelyn Upton and Mary Hastings, both of whom were prominent faculty. Upton Hall, home of the university healthcenter and Residential Life Office, was opened in 1960. Hastings Hall opened in 1968. Together, the complex can house up to 300 students.
Anderson Hall
Robie Andrews Hall: Robie Hall is named after former Maine Governor Frederick Robie, who served from 1883 to 1887. It was built in 1897 to replace a female-only dormitory which had burnt down in 1894.
Phillipi Hall: Opened in 2001. Philippi hall also houses USM's new Pioneer Program.
Upperclass Hall (completed fall of 2007)

Lewiston-Auburn

The Lewiston-Auburn campus of the University of Southern Maine is the newest of the three campuses. The college on this campus is known as Lewiston-Auburn College (USM LAC). USM LAC is committed to being a national leader in interdisciplinary education, serving as a resource for the community, and providing degree programs that are responsive to changing cultural and workplace demands available to a non-traditional and diverse student body.

Baccalaureate degree programs available at USM LAC are: Arts and Humanities, Leadership and Organizational Studies, Natural and Applied Sciences, Social and Behavioral Sciences. Master of Arts in Leadership and Master of Occupational Therapy degrees are offered exclusively at Lewiston-Auburn College. The USM Nursing program (BS & RN to BS) from USM's College of Nursing and Health Professions are also offered at the Lewiston-Auburn campus.

Student life

Dining service 
The Brooks Dining Hall on the Gorham campus was renovated in 2019 at a cost of $2.5 million allowing it to expand the vegetarian, vegan, and gluten-free food  because "students who prefer a plant-based diet were ditching the meal plan, eating elsewhere or foregoing meals." Sodexo operates the dining hall. In spring of 2022, students reported dissatisfaction with the food served by the dining hall, complaining of undercooked meat, overcooked pasta and a lack of vegetarian options. 

In the fall of 2022, Sodexo introduced delivery robots who carry food to students on both the Gorham and the Portland campuses. The robots are called Kiwibots and have special tires to work in the snow. Students must download an app to use the service. The robots can deliver Starbucks lattes and falafel from food trucks parked on campus.

The Free Press 
The student-run and funded campus newspaper was founded in 1972. It publishes a print edition weekly during the academic year, equaling roughly 22 editions a year. The newspaper has a circulation of 3,000. It is an entirely student-run and student-funded newspaper not supported by an academic department. The university does not have a journalism program. In fall 2022, lack of staff led the newspaper to discontinue updates to its websites and social media and focus on the print publication.

Athletics
The University of Southern Maine teams are the Huskies. The university sponsors the 23 sports at the NCAA Division III level. The majority of sports compete in the Little East Conference; wrestling competes as an independent Division III team, men's and women's ice hockey compete in the ECAC East.

Men's intercollegiate athletic teams
 Baseball
 Basketball
 Cheerleading
 Cross Country
 Golf
 Ice Hockey
 Lacrosse
 Soccer
 Tennis
 Track & Field (indoor)
 Track & Field (outdoor)
 Wrestling

Women's intercollegiate athletic teams
 Basketball
 Cheerleading
 Cross Country
 Field Hockey
 Golf
 Ice Hockey
 Lacrosse
 Soccer
 Softball
 Tennis
 Track & Field (indoor)
 Track & Field (outdoor)
 Volleyball

People

Notable alumni

References

Further reading

External links

 
 Southern Maine Athletics website

 
Educational institutions established in 1878
University of Maine System
University of Southern Maine[
Universities and colleges in Androscoggin County, Maine
Universities and colleges in Cumberland County, Maine
Universities and colleges in Portland, Maine
Education in Lewiston, Maine
1878 establishments in Maine
New England Hockey Conference teams